Presidential elections were held in Colombia in 1904. The result was a victory for Rafael Reyes of the Conservative Party.

Electoral system
The 1886 constitution changed the presidential electoral system from one where a candidate had to win a majority of states to be elected (or be elected by Congress if no candidate won a majority of states), to a two-stage system. Voters meeting literacy and property requirements (which were not required for local and regional elections) elected members of an electoral college, who in turn elected the President.

Results

President

References

Colombia
Presidential elections in Colombia
1904 in Colombia